Miss France 2014 was the 84th Miss France pageant, held in Dijon on 13 December 2013. Miss France 2013, Marine Lorphelin of Burgundy crowned her successor Flora Coquerel of Orléanais (now Centre-Val de Loire) at the end of the event.

It was the first time that the pageant took place in Dijon and in the Burgundy region.

The theme of the event was "Disney", it was presented by the national director Sylvie Tellier and Jean-Pierre Foucault for the 19st consecutive year. The event was broadcast live by TF1.

The winner was Miss Orléanais, Flora Coquerel, who gave to her region its first ever Miss France title.

Results

Placements

Preparation
The 33 contestants, Marine Lorphelin and the national director Sylvie Tellier had travelled to Sri Lanka from November, 16 to November, 23.
The rehearsals took place in Dijon.

Contestants

Special prizes

Judges

Crossovers 
Contestants who previously competed or will be competing at international beauty pageants:

Miss Universe
2015:  Orléanais – Flora Coquerel (Top 5)
 (Las Vegas)

Miss World
2014:  Orléanais – Flora Coquerel 
 (London)

Miss International
2014:  Côte d'Azur – Aurianne Sinacola 
 (Tokyo)

Miss Earth
2014:  Provence – Laëtizia Penmellen
 (Manila)

References

External links

2013 in France
December 2013 events in France
Miss France
2013 beauty pageants